Fakir Aftabuddin Khan (1862-1933) was a Bengali musician, composer and lyricist.

Early life
Khan was born on 1862 in Shibpur, Brahmanbaria District, Bengal Presidency, British India. His brothers were the famous musicians Alauddin Khan and Ayet Ali Khan.

Career
Khan learned to play the violin and tabla at the court of the Zamidar of Bangora. He trained in Tripura Raja's court under the court musician Rababi Qasim Ali Khan. He was particularly talented with a flute and also played the harmonium, dotara, and banya. He invented his own musical instruments called the meghadambur and swarasangraha. He also wrote lyrics for the poems of Manomohan Dutta.

He was given the title "Fakir" for his devotion to god and the Goddess Kali and his ascetic lifestyle.

Death
Khan died on 25 January 1933.

References

1862 births
1933 deaths
20th-century Indian composers
20th-century Indian singers
People from Brahmanbaria district
People from Tripura
Bengali musicians
Bengali singers
Hindustani instrumentalists
Sitar players
Hindustani composers